My Boy is a 1975 single by Elvis Presley. 

My Boy may also refer to:

Music

Albums
My Boy (Richard Harris album), 1971 album
My Boy (Marlon Williams album), 2022 album

Songs
"My Boy", a song by Neil Young from his 1985 studio album Old Ways 
"My Boy" (Buono! song), 2009
"My Boy" (Saori@destiny song), 2009
"My Boy" (Billie Eilish song), 2017
"My Boy", a song by Elvie Shane released in 2020

Films
My Boy (1921 film), a 1921 American silent film directed by Victor Heerman
My Boy (2018 film), a/k/a Mon Boy, a 2018 Canadian short film directed by Sarah Pellerin

See also
My Boy Lollipop
My Boy Jack (disambiguation)
That's My Boy (disambiguation)